The 1961–62 season was Manchester City's 60th season of competitive football and 45th season in the top division of English football. In addition to the First Division, in which the club placed 12th, the club competed in the FA Cup and the Football League Cup, being knocked out in the fourth round and the first round, respectively.

First Division

League table

Results summary

References

External links

Manchester City F.C. seasons
Manchester City